Presidential elections were held in Abkhazia on 12 January 2005. The result was a victory for Sergei Bagapsh of United Abkhazia, who received over 90% of the vote.

Background
A Presidential election had been held in Abkhazia on 3 October, but had resulted in a prolonged conflict over the results between the two main contenders, Raul Khadjimba, who had been Prime Minister and who was backed by the seriously ailing outgoing President Vladislav Ardzinba and by Russia, and Sergei Bagapsh, the main opposition candidate who had received a narrow majority of the votes. 
On 5 December 2004 Bagapsh and Khadjimba agreed to hold new elections. In these elections they would run on a joint ticket, with Khadjimba as vice presidential candidate.

Campaign
On 17 December, Sergei Bagapsh was officially nominated by an initiative group. On 21 December, Bagapsh and Khajimba created a joint coordinating council to run their election campaign, consisting of five representatives each: Nugzar Agrba, Valeri Kvarchia, Vakhtang Pipia, Daur Tarba, Alik Logua, Roman Gvinjia, Raul Khonelia, Beslan Kobakhia, Vasili Avidzba and Timur Nadaria, cochaired by Agrba for Bagapsh and Kvarchia for Khajimba.

In the early morning of 23 December an explosion occurred in the centre of Sukhumi, causing no casualties. Later that day, Iakub Lakoba, who had come fifth and last in the first election, was nominated by an initiative group.

Bagapsh and Lakoba were officially registered as candidates by the Central Election Commission on 28 December.

Results

Aftermath
On 2 June 2005, United Abkhazia suspended the membership of Sergei Bagapsh, as required by the Abkhazian constitution since he had become President.

References

 
Abkhazia